WLCH (91.3 FM, "Radio Centro") is a non-commercial public FM radio station licensed to serve Lancaster, Pennsylvania. The station is owned by the Spanish American Civic Association For Equality, Inc., and broadcasts a variety format.

WLCH is one of 33 owned and operated Hispanic Public Radio stations in the United States.

History
WLCH signed on for the first time on September 14, 1987.

Translators
WLCH programming is broadcast on the following translator:

References

External links

LCH
Radio stations established in 1990